The Solar Wings Scandal is a family of British high-wing, single-place, hang gliders that was designed and produced by Solar Wings of Manton, Wiltshire. Introduced in 1995 it is now out of production. When it was available the aircraft was supplied complete and ready-to-fly.

Design and development
The Scandal series was designed as a high performance competition glider. It is made from aluminum and carbon fibre tubing, with the double-surface wing covered in Dacron sailcloth. Some models have a kingpost and top rigging, while others, notably the XK and XK-R, are topless.

The models are each named for their wing area in square metres.

Variants
Scandal 12.4
Small-sized model for lighter pilots, introduced in 1995. Its  span wing is cable braced from a single kingpost.
Scandal 13.6
Mid-sized model for middle weight pilots, introduced in 1995. Its  span wing is cable braced from a single kingpost.
Scandal 14.4
Large-sized model for heavier pilots, introduced in 1995. Its  span wing is cable braced from a single kingpost.
Scandal S 12.4
Small-sized model for lighter pilots. Its  span wing is cable braced from a single kingpost. The glider model is BHPA certified.
Scandal S 13.6
Mid-sized model for middle weight pilots. Its  span wing is cable braced from a single kingpost. The glider model is BHPA certified.
Scandal S 14.4
Large-sized model for heavier pilots. Its  span wing is cable braced from a single kingpost. The glider model is BHPA certified.
Scandal XK
Model introduced in 1997. Its  area wing is topless.
Scandal XK-R 13.6
Mid-sized model for middle pilots introduced in 2000. Its  span wing is topless. The glider model is BHPA certified.
Scandal XK-R 14.4
Large-sized model for heavier pilots introduced in 2000. Its  span wing is topless. The glider model is BHPA certified.

Specifications (Scandal XK-R 14.4)

References

Scandal
Hang gliders